The Ping An Finance Center is a 118-story,  supertall skyscraper in Shenzhen, Guangdong, China. The building was commissioned by Ping An Insurance and designed by the American architectural firm Kohn Pedersen Fox Associates. It was completed in 2017, becoming the tallest building in Shenzhen, the 2nd tallest building in China and the 5th tallest building in the world. It is the second largest skyscraper in the world by floor area after Azabudai Hills Main Tower in Tokyo, Japan.

Progress

The building is located within the Central Business District of Shenzhen in Futian. Its 18,931 square meter lot was purchased by Ping An Group via auction at a price of 1.6568 billion RMB on 6 November 2007. Design of the building began in 2008 with Kohn Pedersen Fox Associates providing the architectural design and Thornton Tomasetti providing structural design. Its foundation stone was laid on 29 August 2009, and construction started in November the same year. China Construction First Building Group was hired as the general contractor to construct the building.

On 15 March 2013, the construction process was temporarily halted, due to the suspected use of concrete made with unprocessed sea sand, which could corrode the steel structure. Construction resumed on the building after sample testing.

On the morning of 15 July 2014, upon a 10-meter-long steel column being lifted to place, the skyscraper exceeded 443.8 meters in height, surpassing the KK100 Tower to become the tallest building in Shenzhen.

The building was topped out on 30 April 2015, and became the second tallest skyscraper in China at a height of 599 meters. The original plan was to add a 60-meter-long antenna atop the building to surpass the Shanghai Tower and become the tallest building in China. However, in February 2015, it was decided that the antenna would not top the tower due to the possibility that it might obstruct flight paths.

Features
The building contains office, hotel and retail spaces, a conference center, and a high-end shopping mall. An observation deck named Free Sky is located on floor 116. As its name suggests, it is also the headquarters of Ping An Insurance. The design of the building is meant to be unique and elegant, and to represent the history and achievements of the main tenant. A stainless-steel facade that weighs approximately 1,700 metric tons provides a modern design to the building.

The building has a total gross floor area of 378,600 square meters. The 118-story tower has a width-to-height aspect ratio of 1:10 and also has an 11-story podium. Including the podium, the building has 495,520 square meters of floor space. A five-level basement adds another 90,000 square meters of area. The 620,000 metric ton tower has eight main columns which form the superstructure. The column dimensions range from approximately 6 by 3.2 m at the lowest level to 2.9 by 1.4 m at the top of the tower.

Elevators
The Ping An International Finance Center is equipped with 33 double deck elevators, travelling at speeds of up to 10 m/s.

Climbing attempts
The Ping An Financial Center has been the subject of frequent rooftopping attempts. In January 2015, daredevil Malaysian photographer Keow Wee Loong climbed the then incomplete building and released video footage and a photo taken from a crane at the tower's top.

The structure was subsequently climbed during Chinese New Year on 19 February 2015 by two Russian and Ukrainian urban explorers, Vadim Makhorov and Vitaly Raskalov from Ontheroofs, who further climbed out to a crane above the under-construction tower and documented their ascent with video and photos.

Phase 2
The second building of the project, a 290-meter, 47-story skyscraper known as the South Tower, has been completed. Construction began in April 2014 and it opened in 2018/19. The complex includes a 5-star Park Hyatt hotel, a planned retail bridge connecting the two skyscrapers from levels 3 through 6.

Current status

Low occupancy
According to South China Morning Post, almost 30 percent of the office space remained empty in the second quarter of 2019.

Gallery

See also

 Burj Khalifa
 Shanghai Tower
 Ping An Finance Center South
 List of tallest buildings in Shenzhen
 List of tallest buildings in China
 List of tallest buildings in the world
 List of buildings with 100 floors or more

References

External links

 Thorton Tomasetti
 Pingan International Finance Center on Emporis.com

Ping An Insurance
Skyscraper office buildings in Shenzhen
Kohn Pedersen Fox buildings
Futian District
Retail buildings in China
Skyscrapers in Shenzhen
Office buildings completed in 2017
2017 establishments in China